Charles Paulk (June 14, 1946 – October 1, 2014) was an American basketball player who spent four seasons in the National Basketball Association (NBA).

High school career
Paulk played basketball for Lester High School in Memphis, Tennessee. Along with him, the 1964 team also featured Rich Jones and Claude Humphrey.

College career
Due to the University of Memphis not admitting African-American players at the time, he went to the University of Tulsa. After one year, he transferred to Northeastern State, an NAIA school at the time.

NBA career
Paulk was drafted by the Milwaukee Bucks in the first round of the 1968 NBA draft. That same year, he was drafted by the Army. In his first season, he played just 17 games, scoring three points per game and garnering 4.6 rebounds per game.  He sat out the 1969-70 season due to military service, serving a tour of duty in Vietnam.

In 1970, the Bucks traded him along with Flynn Robinson to the Cincinnati Royals for Oscar Robertson. The following year, he was traded to the Chicago Bulls for Matt Guokas and a future draft pick. Later that year, he was again traded, this time to the New York Knicks for a second-round draft pick.

NBA career statistics

Regular season

|-
| align="left" | 1968–69
| align="left" | Milwaukee
| 17 || - || 12.8 || .226 || - || .565 || 4.6 || 0.2 || - || - || 3.0
|-
| align="left" | 1970–71
| align="left" | Cincinnati
| 68 || - || 17.8 || .430 || - || .603 || 4.7 || 0.4 || - || - || 9.2
|-
| align="left" | 1971–72
| align="left" | Chicago
| 7 || - || 8.6 || .286 || - || .778 || 2.1 || 0.6 || - || - || 3.3
|-
| align="left" | 1971–72
| align="left" | New York
| 28 || - || 5.4 || .267 || - || .667 || 1.8 || 0.3 || - || - || 1.4
|- class="sortbottom"
| style="text-align:center;" colspan="2"| Career
| 120 || - || 13.7 || .392 || - || .611 || 3.9 || 0.3 || - || - || 6.2
|}

Playoffs

|-
| align="left" | 1971–72
| align="left" | New York
| 7 || - || 1.9 || .300 || - || .000 || 0.7 || 0.0 || - || - || 0.9
|- class="sortbottom"
| style="text-align:center;" colspan="2"| Career
| 7 || - || 1.9 || .300 || - || .000 || 0.7 || 0.0 || - || - || 0.9
|}

Personal life and death
After his career, he became a road promotions manager for bands in the New Orleans area. Paulk had six siblings, five sisters, and one brother. He had two children, Derrek Paulk and Zonna Whitlow. He married Jacqueline Newby in 1990. Together he and Jacqueline (also an educator) co-founded Lincoln High School Boys Basketball Foundation, dedicated to teaching kids life skills using basketball. The foundation now known as Ground-Up is run by Shaun Manning, Jacqueline's son and Charles' stepson. On October 1, 2014, Paulk died of a heart attack at 68.

References

1946 births
2014 deaths
American men's basketball players
Basketball players from Georgia (U.S. state)
Chicago Bulls players
Cincinnati Royals players
Milwaukee Bucks draft picks
Milwaukee Bucks players
New York Knicks players
Northeastern State RiverHawks men's basketball players
People from Fitzgerald, Georgia
Power forwards (basketball)
Tulsa Golden Hurricane men's basketball players
1967 FIBA World Championship players
United States men's national basketball team players